Dusetos is a city in Zarasai district municipality, northeastern Lithuania,  west of Zarasai, near Lake Sartai.

History
According to the 1923 census, 704 Jews were living in the town. As a result of out-migration in the 1920s and 1930s, the number of Jews in the town decreased to around 500 by 1939. On August 26, 1941, Jews of Dusetos, together with the Jews of Zarasai were murdered in a mass execution perpetrated by forces of Einsatzkommando 3, assisted by the Lithuanian police. A monument stands today at the site of the shootings.

Notable people 
List of notable people who were born or have lived in Dusetos
 Faustas Latėnas - composer, theatre manager, politician, and diplomat
Šarūnas Sauka - postmodern painter
Liucija Vaitukaitytė - professional footballer

References

External links

Virtual Tour of Dusetos
 Official district information

Cities in Lithuania
Cities in Utena County
Novoalexandrovsky Uyezd
Zarasai District Municipality